Bengali numerals are the units of the numeral system, originating from the Indian subcontinent, used officially in Bengali, Assamese and Meitei (officially termed as Manipuri), 3 of the 22 official languages of the Indian Republic, as well as traditionally in Sylheti, Chittagonian, Bishnupriya, Chakma and Hajong languages. They are used by more than 350 million people around the world (over 5% of the population), and are a variety of the Hindu–Arabic numeral system.

Base numbers

Extended numbers

An example of the number string:-

1065. One thousand sixty five.
. এক হাজার পঁয়ষট্টি। (in Bengali). এহেজাৰ পঁষষ্ঠি। (in Assamese)

Fractions

The Bengali script has a separate set of digits for base-16 fractions: 

 

This system was the norm for pricing before decimalization of the currency: ২৲ (₹2), ২৷৷৹ (₹2-8, or 2 rupees 8 annas).

See also
Bengali alphabet
Sylhet Nagari

References

Bengali culture
Bengali language
Assamese language
Meitei language
Numerals